Goshtasb Khan Ahmad-e Sofla (also Romanized as Goshtāsb Khān Aḩmad-e Soflá) is a village in Babuyi Rural District, Basht District, Basht County, Kohgiluyeh and Boyer-Ahmad Province, Iran. At the 2006 census, its population was 130, in 27 families.

References 

Populated places in Basht County